Artashes Armoevich Adamyan (born 12 November 1970) is an Armenian football manager who manages Lernayin Artsakh and Artsakh.

Career

Playing career

Adamysan started his career with Soviet third tier side Armavir. In 1989, he signed for Kotayk in the Soviet second tier. In 1991, Adamyan signed for Soviet top flight club Ararat. In 1993, he signed for Spartak (Plovdiv) in the Bulgarian second tier, helping them earn promotion to the Bulgarian top flight. Before the 1997 season, he signed for Russian team Kristall but left due to being caught using stimulants after a game between Armenia and Ukraine. 

Before the 1999 season, Adamyan signed for BKMA in Armenia. In 1999, he signed for Lebanese outfit Salam Zgharta. Before the 2003 season, he signed for Mika in Armenia.

He played in the Armenia national team's first ever game.

Managerial career

He worked as youth director of Russian side Kuban.

In 2021, Adamyan was appointed manager of Armenian second tier side Lernayin Artsakh, helping them earn promotion to the Armenian top flight. After that, he was appointed manager of Artsakh.

References

External links
 

1970 births
Akhaa Ahli Aley FC players
Armenia international footballers
Armenian expatriate footballers
Armenian expatriate sportspeople in Bulgaria
Armenian expatriate sportspeople in Lebanon
Armenian expatriate sportspeople in Russia
Armenian football managers
Armenian footballers
Armenian Premier League managers
Armenian Premier League players
Association football midfielders
BKMA Yerevan players
Expatriate footballers in Bulgaria
Expatriate footballers in Lebanon
Expatriate footballers in Russia
FC Ararat Yerevan players
FC Armavir (Armenia) players
FC Kotayk Abovyan players
FC Kristall Smolensk players
FC Mika players
FC Spartak Plovdiv players
First Professional Football League (Bulgaria) players
Lebanese Premier League players
Lernayin Artsakh FC players
Living people
Russian First League players
Salam Zgharta FC players
Second Professional Football League (Bulgaria) players
Soviet First League players
Soviet Second League players
Soviet Top League players